Mueang Phetchaburi is the capital district (amphoe mueang) of Phetchaburi province, western Thailand.

History
The district was established around 1903. The government named it Khlong Krachaeng because its center was in Tambon Khlong Krachaeng.

Geography
Neighbouring districts are (from the northeast clockwise) Ban Laem, Khao Yoi, Ban Lat, and Tha Yang of Phetchaburi Province and the Bay of Bangkok.

The important water resource is the Phetchaburi River.

Administration
The district is divided into 24 subdistricts (tambon), which are further subdivided into 184 villages (muban). There are three municipal areas within the district. The town (thesaban mueang) Phetchaburi covers tambons Tha Rap and Khlong Krachaeng. There are two townships (thesaban tambon): Hat Chao Sam Ran covers tambon Hat Chao Sam Ran, and Hua Saphan covers  Hua Saphan and Wang Tako. The non-municipal area is administered by 18 tambon administrative organizations (TAO). As of 2019, the district had a registered population of 32,579 in municipal areas, and 90,567 in non-municipal areas.

The 24 subdistricts are:

References

Mueang Phetchaburi